Eugene Mullin (December 18, 1894 – April 15, 1967) was an American screenwriter and film director of the silent era. He wrote for 66 films between 1909 and 1925. He also directed seven films between 1910 and 1921. He was born in Brooklyn, New York and died in Long Island, New York.

Partial filmography
 A Midsummer Night's Dream (1909)
 A Tale of Two Cities (1911)
 Lady Godiva (1911)
 The Pickwick Papers (1913)
 A Florida Enchantment (1914)
 The Bottom of the Well (1917)
 The Cambric Mask (1919)
 The Third Degree (1919)
 The Lane That Had No Turning (1922)
 Never the Twain Shall Meet (1925)

External links

1894 births
1967 deaths
American male screenwriters
American film directors
20th-century American male writers
20th-century American screenwriters